The Heinrich Gleißner Prize is an upper Austrian Cultural Award named after .

Prize 
The main prize honours an artist's previous work and life's work in various fields (music, literature, architecture, painting...). The prize, which has been awarded since 1985, is endowed with 5000 euros. In addition, an encouragement prize is awarded, endowed with 2000 euros.

Laureates

References

Further reading 
 35 Jahre Heinrich Gleißner Preis. Kulturverein Heinrich Gleißner Haus, Linz, 2021. .

External links 

Arts awards in Austria
Awards established in 1987